Sarab Chenar may refer to:

Sarab Chenar-e Olya
Sarab Chenar-e Sofla